Finland competed at the 1980 Winter Olympics in Lake Placid, New York, United States.

Medalists

Biathlon

Men

Men's 4 x 7.5 km relay

 1 A penalty loop of 150 metres had to be skied per missed target.
 2 One minute added per close miss (a hit in the outer ring), two minutes added per complete miss.

Cross-country skiing

Men

Men's 4 × 10 km relay

Women

Women's 4 × 5 km relay

Figure skating

Women

Ice hockey

First Round - Red Division

Final round
The top two teams from each group play the top two teams from the other group once. Points from previous games against their own group carry over, excluding teams who failed to make the medal round.

Carried over group match:
  Finland 2–4 USSR

Leading scorers

Team roster
Antero Kivelä
Jorma Valtonen
Kari Eloranta
Hannu Haapalainen
Lasse Litma
Tapio Levo
Olli Saarinen
Seppo Suoraniemi
Markku Hakulinen
Markku Kiimalainen
Jukka Koskilahti
Hannu Koskinen
Jari Kurri
Mikko Leinonen
Reijo Leppänen
Jarmo Mäkitalo
Esa Peltonen
Jukka Porvari
Timo Susi
Ismo Villa
Head coach: Kalevi Numminen

Nordic combined 

Events:
 normal hill ski jumping 
 15 km cross-country skiing

Ski jumping

Speed skating

Men

Women

References
Official Olympic Reports
International Olympic Committee results database
 Olympic Winter Games 1980, full results by sports-reference.com

Nations at the 1980 Winter Olympics
1980
W